Major-General John Bryan Churcher  (9 September 1905 – 2 August 1997) was a senior British Army officer who, during the Second World War, commanded the 159th Infantry Brigade during the campaign in Northwest Europe and later commanded the 3rd Infantry Division.

Military career
Churcher was born on 9 September 1905 and entered the  Royal Military College, Sandhurst, from where he was commissioned as a second lieutenant into the Duke of Cornwall's Light Infantry, a light infantry regiment of the British Army, in 1925.

He fought in the Second World War as Commanding Officer (CO) of the 1st Battalion, Herefordshire Regiment and then as commander of the 159th Infantry Brigade, serving in North-West Europe as part of the 11th Armoured Division.

After the Second World War he became General Officer Commanding (GOC) 43rd (Wessex) Infantry Division in March 1946, GOC 50th (Northumbrian) Infantry Division and Northumbrian District in August 1946, and GOC 2nd Infantry Division in the Far East in October 1946. He then became GOC 3rd Infantry Division in Palestine in December 1946 and GOC 5th Infantry Division in April 1947–in this role he had orders to disband it.

He became Chief of Staff at Southern Command in 1951–in this capacity he organised the response to the devastating Lynmouth Flood in 1952. He returned to the command of GOC 3rd Infantry Division in 1954 and became Director of Military Training at the War Office in 1957 before retiring in 1959.

He is buried at St Mary's Churchyard at Wargrave in Berkshire.

References

External links

Generals of World War II

|-

|-

|-

|-

|-

1905 births
1997 deaths
British Army major generals
British Army brigadiers of World War II
Companions of the Order of the Bath
Companions of the Distinguished Service Order
Duke of Cornwall's Light Infantry officers
People from Reading, Berkshire
Graduates of the Royal Military College, Sandhurst
Military personnel from Reading, Berkshire